Abdopus capricornicus is a species of octopus in the family Octopodidae, native to the Great Barrier Reef. Individuals are capable of autotomy, sacrificing a writhing arm to a predator to distract it while making an escape.

References

Octopodidae
Molluscs of the Pacific Ocean
Cephalopods of Australia
Molluscs described in 2001